The institution now known as the University of Pennsylvania was founded as a secondary school in 1740 and by the time of the American Revolution had grown to include a college and medical school called the  College of Philadelphia. While it operated under a state charter, it was a private institution with its own board of trustees. Many were Loyalists, and when the revolutionary government of Pennsylvania regained control of the city of Philadelphia after the British occupation of 1777-8, it rechartered the institution as the "University of the State of Pennsylvania," appointed new trustees, and dismissed Provost William Smith. Following repeated lawsuits by Smith and the original trustees, the state restored the college's charter in 1789, but the university continued to operate on the original campus. The two competing institutions merged in 1791, forming the University of Pennsylvania.

References

Penn in the 18th Century - at Penn's archives
 at "The University of Pennsylvania" by Francis N. Thorpe

State of Pennsylvania
Defunct universities and colleges in Philadelphia
1779 establishments in Pennsylvania
Educational institutions established in 1779